The 2019–20 Appalachian State Mountaineers men's basketball team represented Appalachian State University in the 2019–20 NCAA Division I men's basketball season. The Mountaineers, led by first-year head coach Dustin Kerns, played their home games at the George M. Holmes Convocation Center in Boone, North Carolina as members of the Sun Belt Conference. They finished the season 18–15, 11–9 in Sun Belt play to finish in sixth place. They defeated Coastal Carolina in the second round of the Sun Belt tournament before losing in the quarterfinals to Texas State.

Previous season
The Mountaineers finished the 2018–19 season 11–21, 6–12 in Sun Belt play to finish in 10th place. They lost in the first round of the Sun Belt tournament to Louisiana–Monroe.

On March 15, 2019, it was announced that head coach Jim Fox was released from his contract, ending his five-year tenure with the team. On March 28, Presbyterian head coach Dustin Kerns was announced as the team's next head coach.

Roster

Schedule and results

|-
!colspan=12 style=| Regular season

|-
!colspan=12 style=| Sun Belt tournament
|-

|-

Source

References

Appalachian State Mountaineers men's basketball seasons
Appalachian State Mountaineers
Appalachian State Mountaineers men's basketball
Appalachian State Mountaineers men's basketball